Mick Lawlor (born 12 April 1949 in Dublin) is an Irish former footballer who played as a forward.

Son of Kit Lawlor he joined Shamrock Rovers in 1966 and made a scoring debut on 20 April 1966. He scored his first goal for the Hoops the following season in a Dublin City Cup semi final win over Waterford United.

He twice played in the UEFA Cup Winners' Cup for Rovers against Randers FC and FC Schalke 04. He scored 41 League and 8 FAI Cup goals in the green and white and earned one League of Ireland XI cap.

After all the success at Milltown Mick signed for Shelbourne in January 1974.

He later signed for Dundalk F.C. in 1976 and was named Player of the Month in March 1977. He had more success scoring against Celtic at Parkhead in the 1979–80 European Cup. Shortly after he was out of the game for a year with injury and became assistant manager to Jim McLaughlin (footballer). At this stage his younger brother Martin was playing for the club. He resigned from the Oriel Park outfit in May 1981 to seek first team football which he got again at Shelbourne.

Then he signed for Bohemians F.C. in 1982 but announced his retirement in January 1983.

Lawlor was appointed player/manager of Home Farm in March 1984.

He then was appointed manager of Drogheda United in 1986 but resigned in November.

He was also Chairman of the PFAI near the end of his career and managed Clontarf Athletic from 1988.

Lawlor won five full international caps for the Republic of Ireland national football team as well as youth caps.

He was appointed Ireland kit manager in April 2008.

His two brothers Robbie and Martin also played for Rovers, and his uncle Jimmy Lawlor was also a footballer.

Honours
League of Ireland
  Dundalk F.C. – 1978/79
FAI Cup: 3
  Shamrock Rovers – 1968, 1969
  Dundalk F.C. – 1979
League of Ireland Shield
  Shamrock Rovers – 1967/68
Leinster Senior Cup
  Shamrock Rovers – 1969
League of Ireland Cup
  Dundalk F.C. – 1977/78
 Top Four Cup
 Shamrock Rovers 1966
Blaxnit Cup
  Shamrock Rovers 1967–68
LFA President's Cup: 
 Shamrock Rovers 1969/70

References

Sources 
 

Republic of Ireland association footballers
Republic of Ireland international footballers
Republic of Ireland youth international footballers
Republic of Ireland under-23 international footballers
Shamrock Rovers F.C. players
Shelbourne F.C. players
Dundalk F.C. players
Bohemian F.C. players
Home Farm F.C. players
League of Ireland players
Home Farm F.C. coaches
Drogheda United F.C. managers
League of Ireland managers
1949 births
Living people
League of Ireland XI players
Association football forwards
Republic of Ireland football managers